Dead Language is the fourth studio album by Canadian punk band The Flatliners. It was released in 2013 on Fat Wreck Chords. The band released the album for streaming shortly before its release. The album was subsequently nominated for "Metal/Hard Music Album of the Year" at the Juno Awards of 2014.

Track listing

Personnel 
Musicians
Chris Cresswell – composer, guitar, vocals
Scott Brigham – guitar, vocals
Jon Darbey – bass, vocals
Paul Ramirez – drums
Michael Liorti – keyboards

Production
The Flatliners – producer
Steve Rizun – producer, engineer, mixer
Reiss Zurbyk – assistant engineer
Michael Liorti – assistant engineer
Harry Hess – mastering

Artwork
Richard Minino – art director
Gilda Louise Aloisi – photography
John Meloche – layout

References

2013 albums
Fat Wreck Chords albums
The Flatliners albums